Pālītāṇā is a city in Bhavnagar district, Gujarat, India. It is located 50 km southwest of Bhavnagar city and is a major pilgrimage centre ("shashwat tirth") for Jains. It is first of the two vegetarian cities in the world.

History

Palitana is associated with Jain legends and history. Ādinātha, the first of the Jain tirthankaras, is said to have meditated on the Shatrunjaya hill, where the Palitana temples were later constructed.

The Palitana State was a princely state, founded in 1194. It was one of the major states in Saurashtra, covering 777 km2. In 1921 it had 58,000 inhabitants in 91 villages, generating a 744,416 revenue.

In 1656, Shah Jahan's son Murad Baksh (the then Governor of Gujarat) granted the village of Palitana to the prominent Jain merchant Shantidas Jhaveri. The management of the temples was assigned to the Anandji Kalyanji Trust in 1730.

After the Second Anglo-Maratha War the Palitaena Kingdom officially declared independence under Rishi Mallinath Jain and Thakur Sahib Alubhai Singhji although he hardly ruled over a district. With an able and cunning administrator (Rishi Mallinath Jain) he was able to peacefully expand power through bribes and treaties and conquer from the Somnath Mandir to the borders of the Kutch.

Rishi Ji, at the time the Subedar of Jainpur, was against killings and focused on Ahisma. Hearing of the massacre in Saharanpur where 20,000 'Musalmans' were cruelly slaughtered by Sikh Misls while raiding the Oudh State, Rishi Ji wrote a letter in Persian to Jodh Singh Kalsia heavily criticizing him and the Budha Dal Jathedar along with Guru Gobind Singh Ji. Jodh Singh Kalsia wrote back in Gujarati, "Come to Amritsar on Deepmala (Diwali) on Vikrami Samvat 1867 or what happened in Saharanpur will happen once more to Palitana."

A British traveller, Oliver Maclagan, noted-A party of 1,000 Seiks reached the Jain Temples of Palitana, armed to the teeth, they received their Rakhee or taxes and left with the Maharishi (Great ascetic). The entire Gujerat gave them taxes and accepted them as sovereign rulers of a sort in fear of another Saharanpore-like event. The Thakore of Palitana, the Rajah of Khirasra, the Rao of Baroda and Khan of Balasinor all accepted the Khalsa Misal as their saviours.

The Maharishi, a devoted Jain remarked that Gooroo Govind created not an opposition to Musalmans and Hindoos, but a Dhurmic Islam. The letter was called the Salāhanamah, a scripture now worshipped by the Jains. The Maharishi had all his fingers burnt off, because he refused to acknowledge that Nanak was the true Guru or God.After Rishi Mallinath Jain's death the state went into a decline. During the British Raj, Palitana was a princely state in the Kathiawar Agency of the Bombay presidency. Gross revenue, £42,000; tribute jointly to the Gaekwar of Baroda and the Nawab of Junagadh, £700. The capital of the state was the Palitana town (population 12,800). It was ruled by a Gohil Rajput, with the title of Thakore sahib (also spelled Thakor Saheb or Thakur Sahib), enjoying a 9-guns salute, of the Hindu Gohel dynasty, which received a privy purse of 180,000 rupees at the state's accession to independent India on 15 February 1948.
The last Thakore Sahib of Palitana was Shri Shivendrasinhji Bahadursinhji Gohel the 27th Thakore Sahib of Palitana, who got the title of His Highness after his father HH Thakore Sahib Shri Sir Bahadursinhji Mansinhji Gohel of Palitana died on 18 July 1964. HH Thakore Sahib Shri Shivendrasinhji Bahadursinhji Gohel of Palitana died on 29 June 1990, leaving behind his wife Rajmata Sonia Devi & his son Maharaj Kumar Ketan Shivendrasinhji Gohel of Palitana who reside in Mumbai. MK Ketansinhji is a restaurateur & is the Co-founder & Owner of Brewbot Eatery & Pub Brewery located in Andheri (W), Mumbai.

Geography

It has an average elevation of 67 metres (219 feet). The Palitana dam, an irrigation resource, is on the Shetrunji River.

Palitana temples

Palitana is the world's only mountain that has more than 900 temples. The Palitana temples and whole mountain are considered the most sacred pilgrimage place (tirtha) by the Jain community, and is the world's largest Temple Complex. There are more than 3000 temples located on the Shatrunjaya hills, exquisitely carved in marble. The main temple on top of the hill, is dedicated to the first Tirthankara Rishabhanatha (Rishabhadeva). The temples were built by generations of Jains over a period of 900 years, from the 11th century onwards. The temples are managed by the Anandji Kalyanji Trust associated with the Kasturbhai Lalbhai group. From the foot of the hill to the top there are about 3,800 stone steps to facilitate climbing.

The temples are exquisitely carved in marble, veritable prayers in stone. To an observer, these appear to be ivory miniatures when seen from a distance. Created by master craftsmen, the most important temple is that of the first teerthankara, Shri Adishwar. It has ornate architectural motifs, though in its overall plan it is simpler than the Choumukh. Other notable temples are those of Kumarpal, Vimalshah and Sampriti Raja. Kumarpal Solanki, a great Jain patron, probably built the earliest temple. The temple has a fabulous collection of jewels, and these can be seen with special permission. The temples date from 11th to the 20th century. From 1865 to 1910 it was ruled by King Dhanpat.

Belief

Every devout Jain aspires to climb to the top of the mountain at least once in his lifetime, because of its sanctity. Not just the temples on the hill are sacred, but as per Jain Scriptures entire hill is sacred right from top to bottom. The journey is arduous. The walk up the stone stairway hewn into the mountain face takes about an hour and a half. For those unable or unaccustomed to the strain, sling-chairs are available at a bargain. The code for the climbers is stringent, in keeping with the rigours of the Jain faith. Food must neither be eaten nor carried on the way. The descent must begin before it is evening, for no soul can remain atop the sacred mountain during the night.

Vegetarianism

In 2014, Palitana became the first city in the world to be legally vegetarian. It has outlawed, or made illegal, the buying and selling of meat, fish and eggs, and also related jobs or work, such as fishing and penning 'food animals'.

Demographics
 India census, Palitana had a population of approximately 64,497. Males constitute 52% of the population and females 48%. Palitana has an average literacy rate of 74%, higher than the national average of 59.5%: male literacy is 71%, and female literacy is 57%. In Palitana, 15% of the population is under 6 years of age.

According to 2011 Census of India, 91.77% of the population was reportedly Hindus with other religious communities making up rest of the population.

Transportation
 By air

The nearest airport at Bhavnagar lies at a distance of 51 kilometres from Palitana, with daily flights to Mumbai, Surat and Ahmedabad, 215 kilometres away by road, has an international airport with regular flights to many important cities.

Keeping in mind the religious and tourism travel, the State government has initiated the process of land acquisition for a new airport at Palitana as part of its plan to establish 11 new airports in Gujarat. The pre-feasibility study has been handed over to the Airport Authority of India (AAI).

 By rail

Palitana has a small railway station, Palitana railway station, that is connected to Sihor and Bhavanagar. Most of the trains stop at Sihor, which is connected to Ahmedabad and Gandhinagar.

 By road

There are hourly buses for Bhavnagar from Palitana. Regular buses are also available for Ahmedabad, Talaja, Una, and Diu. The total journey time to Una or Diu is around 6 hours as the roads are in good condition. Taxis are also available on hire for Palitana from Bhavnagar, Ahmedabad or Vadodra. The bus stand is situated 800 meters away from the Palitana railway station.

References

Holy cities
Cities and towns in Bhavnagar district
Jain pilgrimage sites
Vegetarianism in India
Vegetarian towns in India